Ali Akbar Yousefi may refer to:
 Ali Akbar Yousefi (footballer)
 Ali Akbar Yousefi (wrestler)